Kémi Séba (French-language version of Egyptian for "black star"), born Stellio Gilles Robert Capo Chichi on 9 December 1981, is a Pan-Africanist political leader, French–Beninese writer, and geopolitical journalist, seen as a prominent figure of anticolonialist resistance in francophone Africa in the 21st century.

Since April 2013 he has been a geopolitical analyst on several West African televisions and has given lectures about Pan-Africanism in many African universities. From 2015, at the head of his NGO Urgences Panafricanistes that he founded, he led a fight against french neocolonialism. He denounces the CFA franc and the lack of monetary sovereignty that affects countries using this currency, through political demonstrations in all French-speaking African countries. He is the initiator of the demonstrations against the CFA franc who took place in January 2017 in several French-speaking African countries.
In January 2018 he was elected as 2017 African Personality of the Year by Africanews, for his fight against French neocolonialism and the CFA Franc in Africa.

Origin
Capo Chichi was born in Strasbourg to immigrant parents from Benin. He joined the US-based Nation of Islam (NOI) as an eighteen-year-old, and later formulated his own ideology while visiting Egypt in his twenties.

In December 2004, Capo Chichi founded the Parisian political group , which promotes black identity and has been accused of racism against Jews. The group said it followed the ideology of the American NOI leader, Louis Farrakhan. They have also been described as proponents of a mix of antisemitic Kemetism and Guénonian Islam. The group's name is an abbreviation for 'The Atenian Tribe of Kemet'.

In a May 2006 demonstration, twenty or more  members marched along the Rue des Rosiers (in the Marais, a Jewish neighborhood) shouting antisemitic slogans and threatening pedestrians. Interior Minister Nicolas Sarkozy sent a letter to Justice Minister Pascal Clément saying  could be indicted for racist incitement. Clément opened an investigation. The Ministry of Interior dissolved  on 26 July 2006, but it reformed in Sarcelles under the name . During the trial of Youssouf Fofana, the leader of the ethnic gang  that murdered Ilan Halimi, Capo Chichi had sent an intimidating e-mail message to various Jewish associations.

Imprisonment
Capo Chichi was arrested in September 2006 for making allegedly antisemitic posts on his website, and again in February 2007 after he called a public official "Zionist scum." After the initial court hearing in 2006, supporters chanted, "The judge is a Zionist, the client is a Zionist, the decision will be Zionist." In February 2007, a French court near Paris sentenced Capo Chichi, the self-described "militant defender of the dignity of Black people " to five months imprisonment for criminal contempt of the law. In April 2008, a Parisian court verdict determined  was the reconstitution of the dissolved group , and sentenced Capo Chichi to a one-year prison sentence with suspension.

In June 2009, Brice Hortefeux, Minister of the Interior, ordered the dissolution of the group , founded to replace .

MDI
After his release from prison in July 2008, Capo Chichi announced that he had converted to Islam. MDI retains close ties with the Shia paramilitary Lebanese-based group Hezbollah in their anti-Zionist campaigns. In June 2009, MDI announced that Holocaust denier Serge Thion had joined the movement. Inside the MDI, neo-nazi blogger Boris Le Lay was "in charge of external relations for the Europe zone".

New Black Panther Party
In April 2010, Malik Zulu Shabazz, leader of the US-based New Black Panther Party (NBPP), appointed Capo Chichi the party's representative in France and gave him the nom de guerre Kemiour Aarim Shabazz. In July 2010, Capo Chichi left his position as the president of MDI but continued as the head of the francophone branch of NBPP.

Struggle in Africa

In 2011, he left the NBPP and moved to Senegal, where he continued his political activism and became a lecturer in African universities and, from 2013, a political columnist in various African television channels. This earned him a certain popularity among the French-speaking African youth, who considered him as a defender of African sovereignty.

Originally close to the Nation of Islam, he eventually joined Voodoo in 2014, which he links to the work of the metaphysician René Guénon about the perennialism as he explains in his latest book Free Africa or death.

He is the initiator of the demonstrations against the CFA franc who took in several French-speaking African countries.
In January 2018 , he was elected as 2017 African Personality of the Year by Africanews, for his fight against French neocolonialism and the CFA Franc in Africa.

In December 2019, while accusing France of being partly responsible for terrorism in the Sahel, Kémi Séba placed himself at the disposal of the regional armies, to fight against the jihadists. He therefore proposed to the presidents of the G5 Sahel the creation of a group of "Pan-African civilian volunteers".

On 23 February 2020, Séba returned to Senegal to attend the appeal for his trial for having burned a CFA franc note. He was arrested at Blaise-Diagne airport, detained for 30 hours and then deported to Belgium. The holding of the trial is then postponed.

In October 2020, Kémi Séba went to Côte d'Ivoire to request a postponement of the 2020 presidential election, following a third term of Alassane Ouattara.

In October 2021, three years after being turned away at Conakry airport, Kemi Seba was allowed to enter Guinean territory from where he met Mamady Doumbunya.

Geopolitical connections 
In March 2015, Kémi Séba was received by Mahmoud Ahmadinejad to talk about the need to collaborate between countries of the Third World confronted with Western imperialism.

In December 2017, he was invited to Moscow by the Russian nationalist intellectual Aleksandr Dugin to talk about the need to create a geopolitical alliance between the Pan-Africanist and Eurasian movements to join forces against hegemony of the West, and consolidate the political project of a multipolar world.

In March 2022, he was invited by the Executive Secretary of the Russia-Africa Forum: What's Next? On MGIMO base Igor Tkachenko gave a lecture on the future of Africa in the world economic system, supporting the position of Russian President Vladimir Putin on the Ukrainian crisis.

In 2022, he was received by the Chairman of the Transitional Government of Mali

On October 24-26, 2022, he arrived in Moscow again upon the invitation of Igor Tkachenko to participate in the Second Youth Forum "Russia-Africa: what's next?" On the basis of MGIMO of the Ministry of Foreign Affairs of Russia. On the fields of which Kemi Ceba delivered his sensational "Moscow" speech and was received by representatives of the Russian Foreign Ministry and other authorities.

On March 12 2023, a televised intervention on the French Parlamentarian channel was cancelled due to accusations him being a asset for Russian propaganda.

Books 
 Supra-négritude, Fiat-Lux éditions 2013, 
 Black Nihilism, 2014
 Obscure Époque – fiction géopolitique, 2016
 Philosophie de la panafricanité fondamentale - Édition Fiat Lux, 2023

Notes

References

External links

Living people
1981 births
Politicians from Strasbourg
Converts to Islam
French Muslims
French people of Beninese descent
Former Nation of Islam members
African and Black nationalists
French expatriates in Senegal
Antisemitism in France